Amphisbaena arda is a worm lizard species in the family Amphisbaenidae. It is endemic to Brazil.

References

arda
Reptiles described in 2003
Taxa named by Miguel Trefaut Rodrigues
Endemic fauna of Brazil
Reptiles of Brazil